Kevin Maguire  (born September 26, 1980 in Newmarket, Ontario) is a Canadian pair skater. He previously competed with Tori Maden, Becky Cosford and Johanna Purdy. With Cosford, he placed 11th at the 2004 Canadian Figure Skating Championships. With Purdy, he was the 2001 Canadian junior national champion and competed twice at the World Junior Figure Skating Championships. Their partnership ended in 2002.

References

External links
 Cosford & Maguire profile

1980 births
Canadian male pair skaters
Living people
Sportspeople from Newmarket, Ontario